The Consulate-General of the Russian Federation in Shanghai is the diplomatic mission of Russia in Hongkou District, Shanghai. It is located at 20 Huangpu Road on The Bund in Shanghai, next to the Garden Bridge near the convergence of the Suzhou and Huangpu rivers, and across the road from the Astor House Hotel. It was established in 1896 and has occupied the present building since 1917.

The Russian Consulate School in Shanghai, an overseas primary school operated by the Russian Foreign Affairs Ministry, is on the consulate grounds.

See also 

 China–Russia relations
 Shanghai Russians
 List of diplomatic missions in China

References

External links

  Consulate-General of the Russian Federation in Shanghai

China–Russia relations
Russia
Shanghai
Buildings and structures completed in 1917
Tourist attractions in Shanghai